Brooke Theiss-Genesse (born October 23, 1969) is an American actress who has starred in film and on television.

Early life
Theiss was born in Palos Verdes Peninsula, California to actors Dick Thies and Kathleen Mitchell. She changed the spelling of her surname to make it easier to spell.

Career
Theiss's first film role was in 1988's Little Nikita, but later that year, her big role came in the hit horror movie A Nightmare on Elm Street 4: The Dream Master as Debbie Stevens. Theiss's best-known TV role is in the 1980s TV series Just the Ten of Us, as Wendy Lubbock, from 1988 to 1990. She also starred in the 1990s TV series Good & Evil, Home Free, and in The Amanda Show from 1999 to 2000.

Theiss has made guest appearances in numerous television shows, including Growing Pains (she played Wendy Lubbock), Blossom, Parker Lewis Can't Lose, Beverly Hills, 90210, American Dreams, and Cold Squad. She also portrayed the character of Maxie from Maxie's World in several commercials for the popular doll.

In 2010 Theiss participated in the documentary Never Sleep Again: The Elm Street Legacy discussing her experiences while filming her role in A Nightmare on Elm Street 4: The Dream Master.

Personal life
Theiss has been married to Canadian actor Bryan Genesse since 1994. They have one son, Mitchell Victor (born July 15, 1995) and one daughter, Aubrey Ann (born October 21, 2008). Theiss has dyslexia.

Filmography

Movies

Television

References

External links

1969 births
20th-century American actresses
21st-century American actresses
Actresses from California
American film actresses
American television actresses
Living people
Actors with dyslexia
People from Palos Verdes, California